Marianne Monson (1975) is an American author of women's history and children's books; and a teacher (currently at Clatsop Community College near her home in Astoria, Oregon). She is the founder of a literary nonprofit, The Writer's Guild.

She earned a BA in Honors English from BYU, a Masters in Creative Writing from Vermont College and a Masters in English pedagogy from Pacific University. Monson was Managing Editor at Beyond Words Publishing, where she edited a number of best-selling titles. She has also taught English and creative writing at Portland Community College and at BYU-Hawaii. She has written and published several books for adults and children as well as historical articles in Rain Magazine, Coast Weekend, Our Coast; she has also published in the Ensign and Friend LDS magazines (her faith).

Among the twelve books Monson has written and published are the "Enchanted Tunnels" series of children's fiction books for LDS children and others, and "The Water is Wide" (2010, Deseret Book) which concerned an ancestor who emigrated to Utah but did not join the LDS church.  In the "Enchanted Tunnels" children's books; "Pioneer Puzzle", "Escape From Egypt", "Journey To Jerusalem", and "Wandering In The Wilderness" (all 2010 by Deseret Book); she uses the names of her two children (Nathan and Aria) for the protagonists' names. With Michelle Roehm McCann and David Hohn, Monson wrote "Finding Fairies: Secrets for Attracting Little People from Around the World" (2004, Whitecap Books, Limited), and edited the "Girls Know Best" series (1999, three volumes, Beyond Words Publishing).

Monson is best known for her women's history books, including nonfiction titles "Frontier Grit: the Unlikely True Stories of Pioneer Women" (2016) and "Women of the Blue & Gray: Mothers, Medics, Soldiers, Spies of the Civil War" (Shadow Mountain Press, 2018). Her historical fiction novel about the life of Martha Hughes Cannon, "Her Quiet Revolution: A Novel of Martha Hughes Cannon, Frontier Doctor and First Female State Senator" was released in Spring 2020 in commemoration of the 100th anniversary of US women's suffrage. Monson's latest novel "The Opera Sisters" was published in September 2022.

References 

Living people
1975 births
American children's writers
Writers from Boston
American Latter Day Saint writers
Pacific University alumni
Brigham Young University alumni
Vermont College of Fine Arts alumni
Portland Community College faculty
Latter Day Saints from Massachusetts
Latter Day Saints from Vermont
Latter Day Saints from Oregon
Mormon feminists
American feminist writers